An army, besides the generalized meanings of ‘a country's armed forces’ or its ‘land forces’, is a type of formation in militaries of various countries, including the Soviet Union. This article serves a central point of reference for Soviet armies without individual articles, and explains some of the differences between Soviet armies and their U.S. and British counterparts.

During the Russian Civil War, most Soviet armies consisted of independent rifle and cavalry divisions, and corps were rare.

During World War II, Soviet armies included the all-arms (общевойсковые), tank (танковые), air (воздушные), and air-defence (противо-воздушной обороны (ПВО)) armies which included a number of corps, divisions, brigades, regiments and battalions belonging largely to the appropriate branch of the armed forces or of the arm of service, such as the rifle corps. In the emergency of June 1941 it was found that inexperienced commanders had difficulty controlling armies with more than two or three subordinate corps, so several armies were disbanded, to be reformed later in the war. Thus Soviet High Command's (Stavka's) Circular 01, of July 15, 1941, directed several changes to Red Army force structure, including the elimination of rifle corps headquarters and subordination of rifle divisions directly to rifle army headquarters. Following the Second World War, an army was reorganised with four or five divisions, often equivalent to a corps in the militaries of other countries. During a war, an Army of the Soviet military was typically subordinated to a front. In peacetime, an army was usually subordinated to a military district.

History
There were large variations in structure and size. For example, in the October 1944 Battle of Debrecen, the 27th Army was a massive organization with nine rifle divisions, an artillery division, and four attached Romanian infantry divisions. The 40th Army, by comparison, had only five rifle divisions. Both armies were part of the Second Ukrainian Front.

Special titles given to Soviet armies included red banner army, following the award of the Order of the Red Banner and shock army. The famous image of the flag over the Reichstag was of men from the 3rd Shock Army's 150th Rifle Division.  In accordance with prewar planning that saw shock armies as special penetration formations, the 1st Shock Army was formed in November–December 1941 to spearhead the December counteroffensive north of Moscow. A total of five shock armies were formed by the winter campaigns of 1942–43, the 2nd (former 26th Army), 3rd, and 4th (the former 27th Army). During the Stalingrad counteroffensive the 5th Shock Army was the last such formation formed. The 2nd Shock Army was reformed three times, most famously after being encircled in the Lyuban operation south of Leningrad, after which its commander, General Andrey Vlasov, went over to the German side.

Armies which distinguished themselves in combat during the Great Patriotic War of 1941–45 often became Guards armies. These included the 8th Guards Army.

As World War II went on, the complement of supporting units attached to a Soviet army became larger and more complex.  By 1945, a Soviet army typically had attached mortar, antitank, anti-aircraft, howitzer, gun–howitzer, rocket launcher, independent tank, self-propelled gun, armored train, flamethrower, and engineer-sapper units.  In particular, the ratio of artillery pieces to riflemen increased as the war went on, reflecting the Soviet need for increased firepower as manpower reserves began to decline after staggering infantry losses.

1963 CIA/DIA assessments were already describing combined arms armies as four motor rifle divisions and a tank division, and tank armies as including four tank divisions, in terms of a 'representative wartime organisation used for planning and instructional purposes'. (p. 16/105)

From the Soviet Air Force, air armies were attached to fronts. They were made up of two to three aviation corps. The 16th Air Army was one of the longest serving, and was active until 2009 in the Moscow Military District.

List of Soviet armies in the Civil War

Regular armies

Cavalry armies

List of Soviet armies from 1930

Combined arms armies 
There were 79 Combined Arms army headquarters created during the Second World War, with 16 permanently disbanded during the war, and over 20 converted to other army, Front or military district headquarters. After World War II, Soviet armies were known as combined arms armies (obshchevoyskovyye armiyi), sometimes translated during the early Cold War as all-arms armies.

Guards armies

Shock armies

Tank and mechanised armies 
Normally made up of two or three tank and mechanised corps. Guards tank armies were made up of a number of Guards tank and mechanised corps.

Reserve armies 
The Stavka formed ten reserve armies in mid-1942 to bolster the Reserve of the Supreme High Command (RVGK).

People's Militia Army 
The Leningrad People's Militia Army (Armiya Leningradskogo Narodnogo Opolcheniya) was born mostly from the 168 battalions of "fighters" previously raised to deal with expected saboteurs and parachutists.  It reported directly to the commander of the Northern Front. The initial intention was to create an army with seven divisions.

Operational groups
The Novgorod Army Operational Group was first established on 13 August 1939  by the order No. 0129 of the Chairman of the People's Commissariat for Defence, Marshal of the Soviet Union K.E. Voroshilov. The Group was created for operations in Estonia and Latvia. It became the 8th Army in October 1939 (or 14 September 1939) It had the task of providing security of the Northwestern borders of the USSR. Was reestablished on July 31, 1941, troops from the east and the management of the defense sector (from 23 July 1941) Luga Operational Group. It was part of the 'operational army' from 31 July 1941 to 6 August 1941 when it was redesignated as the 48th Army. Reformed as an operational group of the Volkhov Front under the command of Major General Korovnikov formed on August 16, 1941, bringing together units to the east of Novgorod, including remnants of the 28th Tank Division. Active 16 August 1941 to 15 May 1942. See :ru:Новгородская армейская оперативная группа.
Luga Operational Group (:ru:Лужская оперативная группа)
Neva Operational Group (:ru:Невская оперативная группа)
other operational groups

See also
 Air Army (Soviet Union)

References

Notes

Citations

Bibliography
Kursk order of battle.
John Erickson, The Road to Stalingrad, Weidenfeld & Nicolson, London, 1975
Feskov et al., The Soviet Army during the Years of the Cold War 1945-91, Tomsk 2004
 - revised version of 2004 work with many errors corrected.
David Glantz, Colossus Reborn: The Red Army at War 1941-43, University Press of Kansas, Lawrence, 2005, 
David Glantz, When Titans Clashed, University Press of Kansas, Lawrence, 1995
Krivosheev, G. F., Soviet Casualties and Combat Losses in the Twentieth Century, Greenhill Books, London, 1997
Aberjona Press, Slaughterhouse: The Handbook of the Eastern Front, Bedford, PA, 2005 (especially for army HQ raising/disbandment dates)
http://samsv.narod.ru/Arm/arm.html - (Russian)

Lists of Russian and Soviet military units and formations